Muhammad Ahsan Younas is a Pakistani police officer who is currently serving as Inspector General of Islamabad Police since 7 December 2021.

References

Living people
Pakistani police officers
Pakistani police chiefs
Inspector General of Islamabad Capital Territory Police
Year of birth missing (living people)